The 2014–15 season will be Lombard-Pápa TFC's 8th competitive season, 6th consecutive season in the OTP Bank Liga and 19th year in existence as a football club.

First team squad

Transfers

Summer

In:

Out:

List of Hungarian football transfers summer 2014

Statistics

Appearances and goals
Last updated on 6 December 2014.

|-
|colspan="14"|Youth players:

|-
|colspan="14"|Players no longer at the club:
|}

Top scorers
Includes all competitive matches. The list is sorted by shirt number when total goals are equal.

Last updated on 6 December 2014

Disciplinary record
Includes all competitive matches. Players with 1 card or more included only.

Last updated on 6 December 2014

Overall
{|class="wikitable"
|-
|Games played || 24 (17 OTP Bank Liga, 1 Hungarian Cup and 6 Hungarian League Cup)
|-
|Games won || 5 (3 OTP Bank Liga, 0 Hungarian Cup and 2 Hungarian League Cup)
|-
|Games drawn || 6 (5 OTP Bank Liga, 0 Hungarian Cup and 1 Hungarian League Cup)
|-
|Games lost || 13 (9 OTP Bank Liga, 1 Hungarian Cup and 3 Hungarian League Cup)
|-
|Goals scored || 13
|-
|Goals conceded || 38
|-
|Goal difference || -25
|-
|Yellow cards || 54
|-
|Red cards || 3
|-
|rowspan="2"|Worst discipline ||  Tamás Nagy (7 , 0 )
|-
|  Marián Sluka (7 , 0 )
|-
|rowspan="1"|Best result || 2–0 (H) v Siófok - Ligakupa - 07-10-2014
|-
|rowspan="1"|Worst result || 0–5 (A) v Videoton - OTP Bank Liga - 29-11-2014
|-
|rowspan="2"|Most appearances ||  Bernardo Frizoni (21 appearances)
|-
|  Milan Bogunović (21 appearances)
|-
|rowspan="1"|Top scorer ||  Saša Popin (3 goals)
|-
|Points || 21/72 (30.44%)
|-

Nemzeti Bajnokság I

Matches

Classification

Results summary

Results by round

Hungarian Cup

League Cup

Group stage

References

External links
 Eufo
 Official Website
 UEFA
 fixtures and results

Lombard-Pápa TFC seasons
Hungarian football clubs 2014–15 season